The Hairy Go North is a UK food lifestyle programme which was broadcast on BBC Two in 2021. The Hairy Bikers hit the road again travelling from the west coast to the east, showcasing some the best food and produce that the north of England has to offer. Along the way, they meet local artisanal producers and explore the best of northern British food.

Episodes

References

External links
Recipes from the series

Hairy Bikers on the BBC

2021 British television series debuts
2021 British television series endings
2020s British cooking television series
2020s British travel television series
British cooking television shows
BBC television documentaries
BBC travel television series
English-language television shows
Motorcycle television series